Manlius Township is located in east-central LaSalle County, Illinois. As of the 2010 census, its population was 6,275 and it contained 2,782 housing units. It contains the town of Seneca and the eastern part of Marseilles.

Geography

Demographics 

The population is 5,652 people, 81% urban and 19% rural. White non-Hispanics make up the largest population with 97%, 0% black, American Indian 0.1%, 0.3% Asian, and 0.7% two or more races. There are 2,317 houses in the township. It has a total area of 23.8 sq. miles.

References

External links
US Census
City-data.com
Illinois State Archives

Townships in LaSalle County, Illinois
Populated places established in 1849
Townships in Illinois
1849 establishments in Illinois